is a 1939 black and white Japanese silent film with benshi accompaniment directed by Kazuo Mori. It is a cheerful period drama, sprinkled with comical scenes and tells the story of a loyal and handsome Edo period servant who fights to help his older brother marry the woman he loves. The star of this film Utaemon Ichikawa gained enormous popularity for his portrayal of a cheerful and chivalrous man.

External links
Nishikie Edosugata Hatamoto to Machiyakko on Internet Movie Database

1939 films
Japanese silent films
Japanese black-and-white films
Japanese drama films
1939 drama films
Silent drama films